Singharamulla is a town located in Western Province, Sri Lanka.

Populated places in Western Province, Sri Lanka